Honey Select (ハニーセレクト) is a virtual reality eroge video game, made by Illusion in 2016.

Its gameplay is similar to Illusion's eroge game Play Club. Players can create or modify virtual models of men and women in great detail, and then direct them to perform a variety of pornographic and fetishistic scenes.

In the view of Destructoids reviewer, the game achieved its goal of becoming "the most polished VR room-scale sex simulator on the market". But he noted that playing the game was not a particularly erotic experience, given its exceptionally complicated controls. Gita Jackson of Kotaku commented on the disparate attention given to certain body parts – twelve parameters for breasts, two for butts, and none at all for penises. In fact, she noted, the game relegated male models to mere "floating dicks", and suggested many more creative options that were in fact available: all it was good for, she wrote, was to create a "vaguely attractive woman with nice breasts, with which you will have glossy, structured, porn-like sex with".

References

Eroge
2016 video games
Video games developed in Japan
Virtual reality games
Windows games
Windows-only games
Japan-exclusive video games
Illusion (company) games